is a direct-to-video film released on November 21, 2011 starring Kazuki Shimizu as himself in a mockumentary of his acting career as Don "Doc" Dogoier in the Super Sentai series Kaizoku Sentai Gokaiger. The film also features cameo appearances by Tokusatsu veteran actors Yoshio Yamaguchi and Nao Nagasawa.

Plot
It is a typical day in the life of actor Kazuki Shimizu when a gun is found inside his bag, leading to all sorts of trouble for him.

Cast
 
 
 Hana Yamanashi
 Ryuga Suda

References

External links
 Toei's official A Day of One Hero site

2011 direct-to-video films
2011 films
2010s Japanese-language films
Toei Company films